Jefferson Township is one of the twelve townships of Preble County, Ohio, United States.  The 2010 census found 3,309 people in the township, 1,680 of whom lived in the unincorporated portions of the township. The Jefferson community is served by National Trail High School and the National Trail Local School district. Interstate 70 runs along the southern part of the township.

Geography
Located in the northwestern corner of the county, it borders the following townships:
Harrison Township, Darke County - north
Butler Township, Darke County - northeast corner
Monroe Township - east
Washington Township - southeast corner
Jackson Township - south
Wayne Township, Wayne County, Indiana - west
Franklin Township, Wayne County, Indiana - northwest

The village of New Paris is located in western Jefferson Township.

Name and history
Jefferson Township was organized in 1809, and named for Thomas Jefferson, third President of the United States. It is one of twenty-four Jefferson Townships statewide.

Government
The township is governed by a three-member board of trustees, who are elected in November of odd-numbered years to a four-year term beginning on the following January 1. Two are elected in the year after the presidential election and one is elected in the year before it. There is also an elected township fiscal officer, who serves a four-year term beginning on April 1 of the year after the election, which is held in November of the year before the presidential election. Vacancies in the fiscal officership or on the board of trustees are filled by the remaining trustees.

Fire and EMS Services 
Fire and EMS services are provided Northwest Fire and Ambulance District. The department is stationed in New Pairs and was originally the New Paris Fire Department.  In 1984 the New Paris Community passed a levy to combine the New Paris Fire Department and the New Paris-Jefferson Township Emergency Squad into the Northwest Fire and Ambulance District on January 1, 1985. They also serve the Northern part of Jackson Township, Preble County, Ohio

References

External links
County website

Townships in Preble County, Ohio
Townships in Ohio